Ali Bilgin (born 17 December 1981) is a former German football player of Turkish descent. His versatility and ability to use both feet allows him to fill in at various positions if needed. One of his former clubs is Rot-Weiss Essen which got promotion to 2. Bundesliga in the 2005–06 season.

Bilgin has made his debut for Antalyaspor in Sakaryaspor match on 13 August 2006 as a 66th min substitute.

After an impressive season at Antalyaspor, he got a full health check up and underwent a medical examination on 30 June 2007. and then signed a contract on 2 July 2007 for 3+1 years.

References

External links
  
 Ali Bilgin at TFF.org 
 

1981 births
Living people
German people of Turkish descent
Turkish footballers
German footballers
Sportfreunde Lotte players
Rot-Weiss Essen players
Antalyaspor footballers
Fenerbahçe S.K. footballers
Kayserispor footballers
Kasımpaşa S.K. footballers
Süper Lig players
2. Bundesliga players
Association football midfielders
Footballers from Essen